Tecpan de Galeana  is a city and seat of the municipality of Tecpan de Galeana, in the state of Guerrero, in south-western Mexico.

References

Populated places in Guerrero